In the United States, the Mercury-Containing and Rechargeable Battery Management Act (the Battery Act) (Public law 104-142) was signed into law on May 13, 1996. The purpose of the law was to phase out the use of mercury in batteries and to provide for the efficient and cost-effective collection and recycling, or proper disposal, of used nickel cadmium batteries, small sealed lead-acid batteries, and certain other batteries.

Effect
The intended objective of the Act was a reduction of heavy metals in municipal waste and in streams and ground water that resulted from the disposal of:

 Mercury in single-use (primary cell) batteries
 Toxic metal content such as lead from lead-acid batteries and the cadmium in rechargeable batteries, namely Ni-Cads

The sale of the first of these was banned (with the exception of the allowance of up to 25 mg of mercury per button cell) and the second family of products was given specific labeling and disposal requirements.

As a result, most retailers who sell rechargeable and other special batteries will take the old ones back for free recycling and safe disposal. The not-for-profit Rechargeable Battery Recycling Corporation (RBRC), used by most retailers, reclaims the metals within the old batteries to make new products such as batteries (mercury, cadmium, lead) and stainless steel (nickel).

See also
 Got Mercury?, a United States public awareness campaign about levels of the element mercury in seafood
 Methylmercury
 Mercury poisoning, a disease caused by exposure to the element mercury or its toxic compounds
 Mercury regulation in the United States
 Mercury vacuum, a vacuum cleaner specifically designed to collect spills and vapors of the element mercury
 Minamata disease, industrial mercury pollution
 Niigata Minamata disease, industrial mercury pollution

References

External links
 Full text at the EPA
 Implementation brochure
 Compliance guide
 Rechargeable Battery Recycling Corporation

United States federal environmental legislation
Acts of the 104th United States Congress
Electronic waste in the United States
Mercury control
1996 in the environment